Dark Twilight (re-released in 2001 by Hardscrabble Books under its original title of Lake Monsters) is a 1991 horror novel by author Joseph Citro. It tells the story of a writer-turned-paranormal investigator who has set out to examine the legendary lake monster of Lake Champlain.

This was the first novel Citro wrote, but was not published until his later novels proved to be successful. In the afterword section of the Harscrabble re-release, Citro describes the book as being less refined and cruder than his subsequent works, but sees it as the genesis of his other novels. Like all of his works, Dark Twilight is heavily influenced by Vermont folklore, and also by the works of H.P. Lovecraft. The main character is at least partially modeled after Citro himself.

Notes

1991 American novels
American horror novels
Novels set in Vermont